Jamie Wall (born 15 April 1977) is a British auto racing driver.

Racing career

Wall was born in Chester, England. He started his racing career in karting in Britain. In 1995 he first raced saloon cars, in the Ford Credit Fiesta Championship. In 1996 he raced in both the Rover Coupe Turbo Cup and the Ford Fiesta Challenge.

In 1997 he competed in the British Touring Car Championship. He raced an ex-works Vauxhall Cavalier for the Mint Motorsport team.

He later spent two years driving in the Australian Super Touring Championship in an independent Honda Accord. In 2001 he drove in the Asia-Pacific Le Mans Series, in a Pilbeam-Nissan. This was followed by a drive in the 2003 Late Model US Stock Car Championship.

Racing record

Complete British Touring Car Championship results
(key) (Races in bold indicate pole position - 1 point awarded all races) (Races in italics indicate fastest lap)

Complete Australian Super Touring Championship results
(key) (Races in bold indicate pole position - 1 point awarded) (Races in italics indicate fastest lap)

References

External links
 BTCC Pages Profile.

English racing drivers
1977 births
British Touring Car Championship drivers
Living people
British GT Championship drivers